Imre Payer (1 June 1888 – 15 August 1957) was a Hungarian footballer. He competed in the men's tournament at the 1912 Summer Olympics.

References

External links
 

1888 births
1957 deaths
Hungarian footballers
Hungary international footballers
Olympic footballers of Hungary
Footballers at the 1912 Summer Olympics
Sportspeople from Győr-Moson-Sopron County
Association football midfielders
Ferencvárosi TC footballers
Wiener AC players
Hungarian expatriate footballers
Expatriate footballers in Austria
Hungarian football managers
Hungarian expatriate football managers
Expatriate football managers in Italy
Udinese Calcio managers
Győri ETO FC players
Atalanta B.C. managers